Richard George Gilbert (born 19 June 1980) is an English cricketer.  Gilbert is a right-handed batsman who bowls left-arm medium-fast.  He was born in Scarborough, Yorkshire.

Gilbert played his only first-class match for Durham UCCE in 2001 against Durham.  In this match, he was dismissed for a duck by Danny Law in his only batting innings.  With the ball, he bowled 18 wicket-less overs.

Gilbert made his debut for Oxfordshire in the 2009 MCCA Knockout Trophy against Bedfordshire.  Gilbert played Minor counties cricket for Oxfordshire from 2009 to 2010, which included 2 Minor Counties Championship matches and 9 MCCA Knockout Trophy matches.

References

External links
Richard Gilbert at ESPNcricinfo

1980 births
Living people
Cricketers from Scarborough, North Yorkshire
English cricketers
Durham MCCU cricketers
Oxfordshire cricketers
People educated at Scarborough College
English cricketers of the 21st century